Nicole Algan (June 13 1924– May 29, 1986) was a French sculptor.

Biography 

From 1942 to 1944 Algan studied the École des Beaux-arts de Paris, in the studio of Charles Despiau. She then worked with Derain from 1944 to 1954.

In 1957 Argan taught sculpture at the  d'Hussein Dey youth school in Alger.

In 1968 she realized en a large monument to the dead of  Saint-Marcel-lès-Valence, made of five blocks of cement three metres high by five metres wide, and a bust of Facteur Cheval at Hauterives.

Exhibitions 
 1971 : L'Œil écoute, Lyon
 1976 : L'art marginal, Nice

Collections 
Musée de Grenoble
 Hauterives, bust at the Palais du Facteur Cheval
 Musée des beaux-arts de Lyon : Le petit dieu, sculpture, wood and steel, 137 x 70 x 30 cm
 Musée de Romans-sur-Isère, jardin : sculptures

References 

20th-century French women artists
20th-century French sculptors
1924 births
1986 deaths